Berwyn  is a suburban city in Cook County, Illinois, coterminous with Berwyn Township, which was formed in 1908 after breaking off from Cicero Township. As of the 2020 census, the city had a total population of 57,250.

History

Before being settled, the land that is now Berwyn was traversed by Native American trails.  The most important trails converged near the Chicago portage, and two notable routes crossed what is today Berwyn.  A branch of the Trail to Green Bay crossed Berwyn at what is now Riverside Drive, and the Ottawa Trail spanned the southern end of the city.

In 1846, the first land in "Berwyn" was deeded to Theodore Doty, who built the  Plank Road from Chicago to Ottawa along the Ottawa Trail.  The trail had been used as a French and Indian trade route and more recently as a stagecoach route to Lisle. This thoroughfare became what is now Ogden Avenue in South Berwyn. In 1856, Thomas F. Baldwin purchased  of land, bordered by what is now Ogden Avenue, Ridgeland Avenue, 31st Street, and Harlem Avenue, in hopes of developing a rich and aristocratic community called "LaVergne".  However, few people were interested in grassy marshland. Mud Lake extended nearly to the southern border of today's Berwyn, and the land regularly flooded during heavy rains. The only mode of transportation to LaVergne was horse and buggy on the Plank Road.

To encourage people to move to LaVergne, Baldwin sold an  strip of property to the Burlington and Quincy Railroad in 1862. The rail line opened in 1864, but the train did not stop regularly in the area. The railroad refused to build a station, so the residents of the area constructed LaVergne Station on Ridgeland Avenue in 1874.

However, the financial panic of 1873 and Baldwin's death in 1876 stunted the growth of LaVergne. Baldwin's daughter, Emma, inherited her father's estate, and in 1879 she sold most of the land to a group of realtors controlled by Marshall Field. The new development enacted building codes and stipulated the minimum building cost of each home. By the end of 1880, 12 new homes were built. By 1888, the settlement had grown so much that the Baldwin family donated the triangular piece of land bounded by Ogden Avenue, 34th Street, and Gunderson Avenue so that a school could be built.  LaVergne School became the first public building in Berwyn.

In 1890, Charles E. Piper and Wilbur J. Andrews, two Chicago attorneys, purchased a  plot of land from the Field syndicate to develop. The land was bounded by Wesley, Kenilworth, 31st Street, and Ogden Avenues. By the following year, the two received approval from Cicero Township to double their land holdings.

Piper and Andrews wanted the railroad to build a station in their development, but the railroad already had stations at La Vergne and at Harlem Avenue. Piper and Andrews decided to build a station with the understanding that trains would stop regularly. They did not know what to name their station so they consulted a Pennsylvania train timetable to find a name. The name they chose was Berwyn, a Main Line suburb of Philadelphia noted for its beauty. After 1901, all settlements in the area were known as Berwyn.

While Piper and Andrews were developing the southern portion of present-day Berwyn, John Kelly was helping to develop the north part from 12th Street to 16th Street. This area was really a part of an Oak Park subdivision, and it even appeared on some maps as "South Oak Park". In fact, children who lived in this area went to school in Oak Park. John Kelly was known as "Mr. Everything" because he was a realtor, builder, insurance seller, and community servant.

In between the two settlements, there was little except for a few farms. The area between 16th and 31st streets was not settled. There were only two paths by which to travel between the two settlements, and today these paths are known as Oak Park Avenue and Ridgeland Avenue. Although Berwyn was chartered as a city in 1908, it was not until the 1920s that this middle portion of land was developed.

During this time, Berwyn was the area's fastest growing suburb. The city's stringent building codes resulted in block upon block of well-built brick two-story bungalows. Many also contained elaborate design elements typically not seen, such as stained glass windows, clay tile roofs, terra cotta, and intricate brick patterns. Today, Berwyn is noted as having the most significant collection of Chicago-style bungalows in the nation.

Demographics

As of the 2020 census there were 57,250 people, 18,277 households, and 12,348 families residing in the city. Berwyn also has the highest population density of any township in Illinois. It and Cicero are the only townships in Illinois that have a higher population density than the city of Chicago.

The racial makeup of the city was 33.33% White, 8.53% African American, 2.79% Native American, 2.52% Asian, 0.03% Pacific Islander, 31.61% from other races, and 21.19% from two or more races. Hispanic or Latino of any race were 64.15% of the population. The top five non-Hispanic ancestries reported in Berwyn as of the 2020 American Community Survey were German (6.5%), Polish (5.8%), Irish (5.2%), and Italian (5.1%), and Czech (2.0%).

There were 18,277 households, out of which 62.32% had children under the age of 18 living with them, 44.98% were married couples living together, 16.13% had a female householder with no husband present, and 32.44% were non-families. 25.88% of all households were made up of individuals, and 9.19% had someone living alone who was 65 years of age or older. The average household size was 3.67 and the average family size was 2.99.

The city's age distribution consisted of 26.1% under the age of 18, 8.7% from 18 to 24, 28.8% from 25 to 44, 23.9% from 45 to 64, and 12.5% who were 65 years of age or older. The median age was 35.6 years. For every 100 females, there were 101.6 males. For every 100 females age 18 and over, there were 99.3 males.

The median income for a household in the city was $61,915, and the median income for a family was $72,241. Males had a median income of $37,584 versus $32,273 for females. The per capita income for the city was $25,939. About 9.0% of families and 12.5% of the population were below the poverty line, including 17.7% of those under age 18 and 10.8% of those age 65 or over.

Note: the US Census treats Hispanic/Latino as an ethnic category. This table excludes Latinos from the racial categories and assigns them to a separate category. Hispanics/Latinos can be of any race.

Geography
Bordering suburbs include Oak Park to the north, Cicero to the east, Stickney to the south, and Lyons, Riverside, North Riverside, and Forest Park to the west. Geologically, Berwyn is predominately composed of Glacial Lake Bottom from the Wisconsin Glacial Episode, the most recent glacial period. A beach ridge of sand and gravel, made during one of the stages of Lake Chicago, is also present in the city. This is most easily identified as Riverside Drive. The elevation change due to the ridge is clearly seen on the 2800 block of Maple Ave. Prior to the settlement of Berwyn, the land was grassy marshland. The body of water that connected the South Branch of the Chicago River to the Des Plaines River was a shallow waterway or a muddy slough (depending on the season) known as Mud Lake. Mud Lake extended nearly to the southern border of today's Berwyn, and the southern end of Berwyn flooded regularly during heavy rains in its early years.

Government

City 
The City of Berwyn operates under a Strong Mayor form of government.  The people of Berwyn elect the mayor, clerk, treasurer, and one alderman from each of the city's eight wards. The terms of elected officials are four years. The mayor is given administrative authority, and he has the power to appoint and remove all officers of the municipality, except those covered by civil service.  The City Council, composed of the eight aldermen and the mayor, is the legislative organ of the city.

The seat of government is located at City Hall, 6700 26th Street.

Police and fire departments

Police 
The Berwyn Police Department, has six main divisions: Administrative, Investigative, Patrol, K-9 Unit, Communications, Records, and Parking.  The Berwyn Police Station is located at 6401 W. 31st Street.

Fire 
The Berwyn Fire Department is composed of 80 sworn professional firefighters, 30 certified paramedics, and 11 emergency medical technicians.  The Fire Department is anchored by three fire stations with the following equipment:

Federal 
Since 2013, Berwyn has been split between three of Illinois' congressional districts: the 3rd Congressional District, 4th Congressional District, and 7th Congressional District.

Post Office 
The United States Postal Service operates the Berwyn Post Office (1940), at 6625 Cermak Road. The post office contains a mural, The Picnic, painted in 1942 by Richard Haines. Murals were produced from 1934 to 1943 in the United States through the Section of Painting and Sculpture, later called the Section of Fine Arts, of the Treasury Department.

Mayors

Education
Berwyn is served by two K-8 school districts:

Berwyn North School District 98 comprises 4 schools: Havlicek Elementary, Prairie Oak Elementary, Jefferson Elementary, and Lincoln Middle School.
Berwyn South School District 100 comprises 8 schools: Emerson Elementary, Hiawatha Elementary, Irving Elementary, Komensky Elementary, Pershing Elementary, Piper Elementary, Freedom Middle School, and Heritage Middle School.

High school students, depending on residency, attend either J. Sterling Morton High School District 201's J. Sterling Morton High School West in Berwyn or J. Sterling Morton High School East in Cicero. Most areas are west of Ridgeland Avenue and therefore are zoned to Morton West, while those east of Ridgeland Avenue are zoned to Morton East.

The Roman Catholic Archdiocese of Chicago operates two PK-8 schools in Berwyn:
St. Odilo School
St. Leonard School

The third one, St. Mary of Celle, closed after the 2004–2005 school year. The building and premises are still used, however. During the great depression, the tuition at St. Odilo was only 75 cents (about $ when accounting for inflation).

Parochial grade school students who wish to move onto parochial secondary education can attend nearby schools such as Fenwick High School in neighboring Oak Park, or Nazareth Academy in La Grange Park, both of which are co-educational. Trinity High School located in River Forest is a school for girls.

Berwyn North School District 98 used to host General Custer Elementary, which was built in 1908 and later torn down in 2000. In 2002, a new state-of-the-art school was built on the same site called Prairie Oak Elementary. Emerson Elementary and Heritage Middle School share a common wall, but are separate schools. When Lincoln Middle School was built in 1928, it never had a cafeteria or library, the library was across the street (now the Berwyn Cultural Center).

LaVergne School, built in 1888, was the first school built in Berwyn, the building had two classrooms with fireplaces. Despite community protest, the 50-year-old building was torn down in 1938.  It was replaced with the Lavergne Education Centre which, once an elementary school, is now the headquarters of the Berwyn South School District 100.

Economy

While Berwyn is known as the "City of Homes," it also contains four primary business corridors: Ogden Ave, the Depot District, Cermak Road, and Roosevelt Road.  Ogden Ave, a segment of historic Route 66, is an automobile-centered district, and at its peak the road included over a dozen car dealerships in Berwyn.  The Depot District, the area around the train station, includes an array of independent shops and restaurants.  Loyola MacNeal Hospital, the city's largest employer, is at the center the district.  Cermak Road earned the nickname "The Bohemian Wall Street" due to the many savings and loans located there. In 1991, the Chicago Sun-Times reported that "Berwyn has the highest concentration of financial institutions in the world - a tribute to the frugality of its forebears." 

The Cermak Plaza Shopping Center, which opened in 1956, is located at the corner of Harlem Avenue and Cermak Road. Notable original tenants included J. C. Penney, Walgreens, F.W. Woolworth, Kinney Shoes, Jewel Foods and Fannie May Candies. Cermak Plaza served as the main shopping center for the area until 1975 when the North Riverside Park Mall opened a half mile west on Cermak Road. Current tenants include Tony’s Finer Foods, Marshalls, Party City, K&G, Office Depot and Dollar Tree.  Cermak Road now includes an array of retail shops and restaurants.  Roosevelt Road is home to several music venues, including FitzGerald's Nightclub, Wire, and the Harlem Avenue Lounge blues club, and Friendly Tap.

According to Berwyn's 2013 Comprehensive Annual Financial Report, the top employers in the city were:

Transportation

Train 

Berwyn is served by the BNSF Railway Line, and Metra operates three stations within the city: the Harlem Avenue Station, the Berwyn Station at Oak Park Ave, and the La Vergne Station at Ridgeland Ave.

Until 1952 Berwyn was served by the Douglas branch of the Chicago "L". The line was extended in 1924 to Oak Park Ave, just north of Cermak Rd.  In 1952 rail service west of 54th Ave was suspended and replaced by bus. The fairways that once served as the right of way for the "L" still exist as parking lots for shopping along the Cermak avenue corridor.

Berwyn was also briefly served by a steam line that ran along 19th Street at the end of the 19th and beginning of the 20th century.  A station was located at Ridgeland Ave. The line was built in 1890 by the Chicago and Northern Pacific Railroad under the name Chicago & Southwestern Railroad.  It extended from the C&NP mainline at 45th Street south to 16th Street and then to 19th Street.  It then turned north on Harlem, returning to the C&NP mainline. The different shaped lots between Austin Blvd and Ridgeland along 19th Street attest to the previous presence of the line.

Bus 
Bus service within Berwyn and to neighboring suburbs is provided by Pace Bus.

Walkability and carbon footprint 
Berwyn residents may be able to lead a low carbon footprint lifestyle, according to The Five Ton Life. This is due to walkable neighborhoods of modestly sized bungalows, and easy access to grocery stores.

Arts and culture 
Berwyn now has a growing arts community with a professional equity theater, an Arts Council and music and entertainment venues. The 16th Street Theater producing live events opened in 2007. It was named "Best Emerging Theater Company" by Chicago magazine in 2013.

Annual events 
From the 1920s to the 1970s, Berwyn had a large Czechoslovak population, and to celebrate their heritage the Houby Day Parade was organized in 1968.  The parade continues to today, and it coincides with the fall mushroom harvest.

Ogden Avenue is part of the "Historic Route 66" in Berwyn, and an annual Vintage Car Show has taken place in the city every year in early September since 1990. Ogden Avenue is closed to traffic from Ridgeland to Oak Park Avenue, and hundreds of car enthusiasts come out to celebrate the spirit of Route 66. In 2006, Berwyn began to host its annual art car parade called Cartopia. Art car artists from all over the country meet to show off their latest creations and then parade through the neighborhood.

In the 1960s and 1970s, many Italian families moved into Berwyn. The Maria SS Lauretana Italian-Sicilian Religious Festival was held on the grounds of Morton West High School during Labor Day weekend until 2014.

Since the year 2000, Berwyn has held an Oktoberfest and Brew Fest around mid to late-September; the festivals are held at the tracks on Berwyn Station and Proska Park respectively.

Public art 
Berwyn was notable for the sculpture Spindle, created by artist Dustin Shuler and located in the Cermak Plaza shopping center along with other works of art. The Spindle was shown in the movie Wayne's World. It was demolished and scrapped on the night of May 2, 2008 to make way for a new Walgreens. Grassroots efforts to Save the Spindle failed to raise the $300,000+ that it would have taken to dismantle and relocate it.  This was a major upset among supporters of the sculpture, considering that it did not encroach upon the new Walgreens' final location. The two topmost cars were placed in storage;  the Berwyn Route 66 Museum on Ogden Avenue proposes to incorporate them into a reconstruction of the Spindle.

Film and television 
Portions of the 2008 film Wanted with Angelina Jolie were filmed at Cermak Plaza.  Segments of the films A League of Their Own, The Color of Money, and Adventures in Babysitting were filmed at FitzGerald's Nightclub in Berwyn.

Berwyn is also mentioned frequently on the television show Svengoolie. (The show has been shot in Chicago since 1970, while hosts Jerry G. Bishop and Rich Koz are natives of the Chicago metro.)

Berwyn is also known for often being used in television productions, such as the shows Chicago P.D. and Chicago Fire, and most recently as of October 2019, The Chi, in which an episode was filmed at J Sterling Morton West High School.

Parks and recreation 

Many parks and community centers are located within Berwyn. Two park districts and a recreation department maintain the city's recreational facilities and organize leagues and programming for youth, adults, and seniors. It contains numerous flower beds, 64 species of trees, 85 species of shrubs, as well as a small pond and stream. Recreational facilities include three tennis courts, two softball fields, and a large playground.

Berwyn is also home to the Pav YMCA.  In 1987, the YMCA opened at 2947 Oak Park Ave, on the former site of a lumber yard that had burned down a decade earlier. The building has an Olympic-sized indoor pool, racquet and handball courts, a gym, and exercise facilities.  A rehabilitation center operated in conjunction with MacNeal Memorial Hospital is present as well.

The following table includes a complete list of Berwyn's public parks and recreational centers:

Features
Berwyn is a very diverse community, with some larger homes on its south side and many smaller, bungalow-type homes on the north side around Roosevelt Road and Cermak Road.  The town also has many duplexes and three unit buildings.  Because of the predominance of small residences in Berwyn, the community has an unusually low carbon footprint.  According to data published by the Center for Neighborhood Technology, Berwyn had the lowest per capita CO2 emissions from homes and private vehicles in the Chicago area.

Berwyn has one of the world's largest laundromats,  in size, with 161 washers and 140 dryers, a kids' play area, big screen TVs, a bird sanctuary, and free pizza on Wednesday nights. It incurred extensive damage from an electrical fire in 2004 but was rebuilt in early 2006. This laundromat received considerable recognition for using a solar thermal system (the largest such installation in Illinois) to meet its hot water needs.

The Berwyn Eagles Club is a small venue that plays host as a bingo hall as well as an arena for monthly professional wrestling events held by All American Wrestling, which is considered to be one of the top independent pro wrestling companies in the Midwest.

Notable people 

 Jeff Adams, football player; born in Berwyn
 Christopher Bielawski, Clarivate Analytics Highly Cited Researcher in synthesis and polymer chemistry
 Scarlett Bordeaux, professional wrestling valet in WWE and Ring of Honor; resides in Berwyn
 Dianne Chandler, model, Playboy Playmate
 Richard Christiansen, film and theatre critic, born in Berwyn
 Ray Clay, former Chicago Bulls public address announcer; born in Berwyn
 Allan Cox, author and business leader; born in Berwyn
 George E. Dolezal, state representative and judge; served as mayor of Berwyn
 Nick Fuentes, White Supremacist political commentator; as of 2022 lives in and broadcasts his online show from Berwyn
 Joey Goodspeed, running back for the Minnesota Vikings, St. Louis Rams, and San Diego Chargers; born in Berwyn
 Ozzie Guillén, Major League Baseball player and manager, lived in Berwyn during playing days with Chicago White Sox
 Gary Hallberg, golfer with the PGA Tour; born in Berwyn
 Fred Malek, businessman
 Ricky Mandel, professional wrestler who competed for Lucha Underground
 John J. McNichols, Illinois state representative and lawyer
 Stan Mikita, professional National Hockey League player for the Chicago Blackhawks, resided in Berwyn during his playing days
 Bob Miller, pitcher for Detroit Tigers, Cincinnati Reds, and New York Mets; born in Berwyn
 Arthur Nielsen, market analyst who founded ACNielsen company
 John Philip Novak, state legislator
 Bob Odenkirk, actor and comedian best known as Saul Goodman on Breaking Bad and Better Call Saul
 Robert Pechous, educator and politician
 Jim Peterik, musician, founding member of The Ides of March and Survivor
 Sondra Radvanovsky, opera singer
 Joseph G. Sevcik, state representative and lawyer; lived in Berwyn and served as the city attorney of Berwyn
 Vlasta Vraz, Czech relief worker after WWII
 Jerry Wainwright, head coach for DePaul University Blue Demons basketball; born in Berwyn
 Dave Wehrmeister, pitcher for San Diego Padres, New York Yankees, Philadelphia Phillies, and Chicago White Sox; born in Berwyn
 Bob Will, outfielder for Chicago Cubs; born in Berwyn
 David Huffman, Actor
 Brian Gutiérrez, soccer player for Chicago Fire

References

Notes

External links
City of Berwyn official website
 

 
Cities in Illinois
Chicago metropolitan area
Cities in Cook County, Illinois
Populated places established in 1856
1908 establishments in Illinois
Majority-minority cities and towns in Cook County, Illinois